Chris Duarte may refer to:
Chris Duarte (basketball) (born 1997), Dominican basketball player
Chris Duarte (musician) (born 1963), American guitarist, singer, and songwriter